Eric Kevin Bruntlett (born March 29, 1978) is an American former professional baseball utility player, who played in Major League Baseball (MLB) for the Houston Astros and Philadelphia Phillies.

That October, he was one of the unexpected heroes of the club's World Championship victory over the Tampa Bay Devil Rays. In Game 5, after Pat Burrell doubled, Bruntlett pinch ran for him, with the score tied in the seventh inning; he moved to third, as Shane Victorino grounded out, then scored the winning run, on an RBI-single by Pedro Feliz. Bruntlett also played on the Phillies’ 2009 National League (NL) pennant-winning team, as he had previously done, for the Houston Astros’  NL pennant-winner. In , after becoming a free agent, he spent the  season playing for the Minor League Baseball (MiLB) Triple-A affiliates of the Washington Nationals and New York Yankees, respectively. Following the season, Bruntlett retired from active play.

Early life and education
Bruntlett was born in Lafayette, Indiana and is a 1996 graduate of William Henry Harrison High School in West Lafayette, Indiana, where he was a two-time All-Indiana selection in both baseball and football. He attended Stanford University. During his tenure as a member of the Cardinal, Stanford made three appearances in the College World Series. In 1997, he played collegiate summer baseball with the Cotuit Kettleers of the Cape Cod Baseball League.

Minor leagues
The Houston Astros selected Bruntlett in the ninth round of the 2000 MLB draft. He was assigned to the Martinsville Astros. He quickly progressed through the minor league system and reached the major leagues in 2003 with Houston.

Major leagues

Houston Astros
During his first years with the Astros, Bruntlett primarily served as a backup to shortstop Adam Everett but also played second base, third base, and the outfield. His best season was in 2006, hitting .277 in 73 games and posting a .412 batting average as a pinch hitter. On November 7, 2007, Bruntlett was traded to the Philadelphia Phillies along with Brad Lidge for Geoff Geary, Michael Bourn, and Mike Costanzo.

Philadelphia Phillies

In 2008, Bruntlett hit .217 with 46 hits, 2 home runs, and 15 RBIs.

His biggest mark was left in the post-season. He hit a home run in Game 2 of the World Series followed by a game-winning run in Game 3. Bruntlett would cap off his World Series performance by scoring the series-clinching run in Game 5, allowing the Phillies to win their first World Series since 1980 and second overall.

Bruntlett performed the fifteenth unassisted triple play of the modern era in the bottom of the ninth inning on August 23, against the New York Mets at Citi Field, when he caught a line drive from Jeff Francoeur, tagged second base to double off Luis Castillo, and tagged Daniel Murphy as he was running to second base. Both Castillo and Murphy had reached base on misplays by Bruntlett. It was the second game-ending unassisted triple play in Major League Baseball history and the first in the National League, preserving a 9–7 Phillies win. Bruntlett would appear as a fielder in only four additional major league games after this play.  Rather than accepting an assignment to Triple-A, Bruntlett was released by the Phillies on November 16.

Final season

On December 28, 2009, Bruntlett signed a minor league contract with the Washington Nationals. He also received an invitation to Spring Training.
He was reassigned at the end of Spring Training to minor league camp. He was released on June 2, 2010. On June 17, 2010,  Bruntlett signed a minor league contract with the New York Yankees; he was granted free agency on November 6, 2010. He decided to retire from baseball and be a stay-at-home dad rather than spend another year in AAA.

References

External links
 

  
Eric Bruntlett at Baseball Almanac
Eric Bruntlett at Astros Daily

1978 births
Living people
Houston Astros players
Philadelphia Phillies players
Baseball players from Indiana
Major League Baseball infielders
Major League Baseball outfielders
Sportspeople from Lafayette, Indiana
Martinsville Astros players
Round Rock Express players
New Orleans Zephyrs players
Syracuse Chiefs players
Scranton/Wilkes-Barre Yankees players
Cotuit Kettleers players
Stanford Cardinal baseball players
Mat-Su Miners players